This is a list of magazines and newspapers published in North Macedonia.

References

North Macedonia
Macedonian-language magazines